Loeb or Löb is a surname of German and Yiddish origin. It is derived from the word lion in German and Yiddish in different historic and dialectal forms (Löwe, Lewe, Löb, Leb, Leib). In Yiddish it is mostly written לייב (Leib). People with the surname include:

Löb
 Eliezer Löb (1837–1892), German rabbi
 Ladislaus Löb (born 1933), professor emeritus of German and author
 Leopold Löb, birth name of Leopold Einstein (1833–1890), German Esperantist
 Martin Löb (1921–2006), German mathematician
 Rudolf Löb (1877–1966), German banker

Loeb
Avi Loeb, theoretical astrophysicist
 Albert Henry Loeb (1868–1924), attorney and an executive of Sears, Roebuck and Co., father of convicted murderer Richard Albert Loeb of the infamous Leopold and Loeb
 Arthur Lee Loeb (1923-2002) Dutch scientist and crystallographer
 Carl M. Loeb, President of the American Metal Company and founder of Carl M. Loeb & Co., later Loeb Rhoades & Co. and father of John Langeloth Loeb Sr.
 Chuck Loeb (1955–2017), American jazz guitarist
 Daniel S. Loeb, American hedge fund manager and founder of Third Point LLC
 Gerald M. Loeb, Chairman of E.F. Hutton & Co., noted trader, financial writer and founder of the Gerald Loeb Award
 Jacob Moritz Loeb (1875-1944), American businessman and philanthropist, former president of the Chicago Board of Education
 Jacques Loeb (1859–1924), German-born American physiologist and biologist
 James Loeb (1867–1933), banker, son of Solomon Loeb and founder of the Loeb Classical Library
 James I. Loeb (1908–1992), American politician and activist
 Jamie Loeb (born 1995), American tennis player
 Janice Loeb (1902–1996), American cinematographer, screenwriter, film director and producer
 John Jacob Loeb (born 1910), American Composer and son of Jacob Moritz Loeb, the American businessman and philanthropist.
 John Langeloth Loeb Sr. (1902–1996), banker and co-founder (with father, Carl M. Loeb) of Loeb, Rhoades & Co. in 1937.
 John Langeloth Loeb Jr. (1930–), US ambassador to Denmark (1981–1983). Delegate to the United Nations (1984). Chairman (since 1979) of Loeb, Rhoades Trust Company
Johanna Unna Loeb, American philanthropist, mother of Jacob Moritz Loeb and Albert Henry Loeb
 Jeph Loeb, American film and television writer, producer and comic book writer
 Lisa Loeb (born 1968), American singer-songwriter and actress
 Marshall Loeb (1929–2017), American author, editor, commentator and columnist specializing in business matters
 Nicholas M. Loeb (born 1975), American businessman 
 Peter A. Loeb, American mathematician
 Philip Loeb (1892–1955), American actor blacklisted by the House Un-American Activities Committee
 Richard Loeb (1905–1936), American murderer, part of Leopold and Loeb
 Rudolf Löb (1877–1966), German banker, Mendelssohn & Co.
 Sam Loeb (born Joseph Loeb IV, 1988–2005), son of comic book writer Jeph Loeb
 Sébastien Loeb (born 1974), French Rally driver, 9 times World Rally Champion
 Solomon Loeb (1828–1903), American banker, founder of investment bank Kuhn, Loeb & Co. and father of James Loeb
 Sophie Irene Loeb-Simon (1876–1929), American journalist and social welfare advocate
 Susanna Loeb, American educational economist
 Vernon Loeb, American journalist
 William Loeb, Jr. (1866–1937), secretary to President Theodore Roosevelt
 William Loeb III (1905–1981), publisher of the Manchester Union Leader newspaper

See also
 Loeb (disambiguation)
 Loewe (disambiguation) 
 Löwe (disambiguation)

References 

Germanic given names
Jewish given names
Germanic-language surnames
German-language surnames
Jewish surnames
Levite surnames
Yiddish-language surnames